King Malabo may refer to:
 Malabo Lopelo Melaka, (1837-1937) King Malabo (I)
 Francisco Malabo Beosá, (1896-2001) King Malabo (II)